This is a list of seasons played by the women's association football team of SC Sand, a sports club from Willstätt currently competing in the German Bundesliga.

Summary

References

seasons
Sand
Sand